Chou Yu-cheng (born 1976) is a Taiwanese conceptual artist based in Taipei.

Biography
Chou Yu-cheng was born in Taipei, and received a BFA from the National Taiwan University of Arts in 1999 and an MFA from the École nationale supérieure des Beaux-Arts de Paris in 2007. A graduate from the research programme La Seine, he received the Taipei Art Award in 2012 and the Taishin Annual Visual Art Award in 2011.

Work
His work is held in museum collections including the Hong-gah Museum in Taiwan, and the Centre for Chinese Contemporary Art in Manchester in the United Kingdom.

Exhibitions
Chou has exhibited at the Künstlerhaus Bethanien in Berlin, the Centre for Chinese Contemporary Art in Manchester and the Taipei Fine Art Museum in Taipei. His work 'Chemical Gilding, Keep Calm, Galvanise, Pray, Gradient, Ashes, Manifestation, Unequal, Dissatisfaction, Capitalise, Incense Burner, Survival, Agitation, Hit, Day Light' was shown at the Künstlerhaus Bethanien in Berlin in 2015 Other exhibitions include:

 2012 – Neon, National Taiwan Museum of Fine Arts, Taichung, Taiwan
 2014 – Listz, Kaohsiung Museum of Fine Arts, Kaohsiung, Taiwan
 2015 – Another Geoff Molyneux, Asia Now Paris, Paris, France.

References

1976 births
Living people
Artists from Taipei
National Taiwan University of Arts alumni
École des Beaux-Arts alumni